Andreas Schou (born 2 September 1986) is a Danish equestrian. He competed in the individual jumping event at the 2020 Summer Olympics.

References

External links
 

1986 births
Living people
Danish male equestrians
Olympic equestrians of Denmark
Equestrians at the 2020 Summer Olympics
People from Kolding
Show jumping riders
Sportspeople from the Region of Southern Denmark